Caucasian carpets and rugs are primarily made in villages, rather than in cities. They are made from materials particular to individual tribal provinces, the rugs of the Caucasus normally display bold geometric designs in primary colors. Styles typical to the Caucasus region are Daghestan, Verne, Shirvan, Ganja, Kazakh, Karabagh, and Quba rugs. Several carpet styles from contemporary northwestern Iran also fall largely into this bracket, such as the Ardabil rugs.

References

Further reading  
Neff, Ivan C. and Carol V. Maggs. Dictionary of Oriental Rugs. London: AD. Donker LTD, 1977.  
Gardiner, Roger F. “Spuhler Revisited: Further Thoughts on the West Berlin Rug Catalog.” November, 1988.[1]. 
Dimand, M.S. "Two Fifteenth Century Hispano-Moresque Rugs." 1964.. 
Sherrill, Sarah B."Carpets and Rugs of Europe and America."New York: Abbeville Press, 1996.  
Black, David. "The Atlas of Rugs and Carpets."London:Tiger Books, 1996.  
Ford, P.R.J. "Oriental Carpet Design."Thames and Hudson, London.1989. 
Bennett, Ian. "Oriental Rugs, Volume 1 Caucasian", Antique Collectors Club 1981, 
Yetkin, Serare. "Early Caucasian Carpets in Turkey Volume I-II", Oguz Press 1978, 

Rugs and carpets
Turkic rugs and carpets